Las Misiones Airport  is an airport serving Cañete, town in the Bío Bío Region of Chile.

The original  runway was moved slightly west and shortened prior to 2010.

The airport runs along the highway just north of Cañete. There is high terrain northeast of the runway.

See also

Transport in Chile
List of airports in Chile

References

External links
OpenStreetMap - Las Misiones
 Aeródromo: Las Misiones in aipchile.gob.cl
OurAirports - Las Misiones
SkyVector - Las Misiones
FallingRain - Las Misiones Airport

Airports in Chile
Airports in Biobío Region
Cañete, Chile